Jacobus Pieter Thijsse (25 July 1865 – 8 January 1945) was a Dutch conservationist and botanist. He founded the
Society for Preservation of Nature Monuments in the Netherlands.

In 1925, on the occasion of his 60th birthday he was honored by his friends with the gift of Thijsse's Hof (Thijsse's Garden), a wildlife garden in Bloemendaal near Haarlem. This was the first wildlife garden in the Netherlands, and one of the oldest worldwide.

In the late 1920s and 1930s, the Verkade company hired Jac. P. Thijsse to write a series of collector albums on flora of the Netherlands. The albums were illustrated by picture cards which could be collected with the purchase of verkade products. These albums were very popular among the Dutch population before World War II.

The "Jac. P. Thijssepark" in Amstelveen, another wildlife garden, was named after him. He was placed 87th on De Grootste Nederlander (The Greatest Dutchman) list in 2004.

References

External links 

 

19th-century Dutch botanists
20th-century Dutch botanists
1865 births
1945 deaths
Dutch conservationists
People from Maastricht